Kondoros is a town in Békés County, in the Southern Great Plain region of south-east Hungary.

Jews lived in Kondorosh at the end of the 19th century and at the beginning of the 20th century, the local Jewish community was subordinate to the Szarvas community. In 1944, most of the city's Jews were murdered in the Holocaust.

Geography 
It covers an area of 81.84 km² and has a population of 5,355 people (2009).

Twin towns – sister cities

Kondoros is twinned with:
 Atid, Romania
 Gabčíkovo, Slovakia
 Hanhofen, Germany
 Kikinda, Serbia
 Tekovské Lužany, Slovakia

References

External links

  in Hungarian
 Symbols of Hungary

Slovak communities in Hungary
Populated places in Békés County
Jewish communities destroyed in the Holocaust